Grigori Valeryevich Chetverik (born 19 July 1987) is a former Russian former professional football player.

Club career
He played in the Russian Football National League for FC Torpedo Vladimir in the 2011–12 season.

Personal life
He is a son of coach Valeri Chetverik.

External links
 
 

1987 births
People from Naberezhnye Chelny
Living people
Russian footballers
Association football midfielders
FC Gomel players
Belarusian Premier League players
Russian expatriate footballers
Expatriate footballers in Belarus
FC Torpedo Vladimir players
Sportspeople from Tatarstan